The Tri-State Transit Authority (TTA), which markets itself as "THE Transit Authority, is the city bus system in Huntington, West Virginia, and Ironton, Ohio, as well as its suburbs.  Its buses range, on the West Virginia side from 21st Street in Kenova, WV to Milton, West Virginia, about 20 miles to the east.  On the Ohio side the buses range from downtown Ironton to the Huntington suburb of Proctorville, Ohio, which is also a range of about 20 miles.  Interchange buses provide links between Huntington and Chesapeake, Ohio, and between Ironton and Ashland, Kentucky, where transfers are available to the Ashland Bus System (ABS).  However the system does not interchange between the TTA and ABS in Ceredo, West Virginia, even though the buses pass within a few blocks of one another.

The TTA was involved in a joint venture with the Charleston, West Virginia-based Kanawha Valley Regional Transportation Authority bus system called Intelligent Transit which linked downtown Huntington to Charleston via bus.  The service ceased August 28, 2015 due to low ridership and lower gas prices compared to 2012.

All buses begin and end at the old Greyhound Bus Depot in downtown Huntington, which is now known as the TTA Center. Coordinates:

Routes
TTA bus services operate on Monday to Saturday between 6:00 a.m. and 11:15 p.m. except for the Marshall Shuttle Evening Service.

References

External links
 Official website

Bus transportation in West Virginia
Bus transportation in Ohio
Huntington, West Virginia
Ironton, Ohio
Transportation in Cabell County, West Virginia
Transit agencies in Ohio
Transit agencies in West Virginia